Naesen is a surname. Notable people with the surname include:
 Lawrence Naesen (born 1992), Belgian cyclist
 Oliver Naesen (born 1990), Belgian cyclist

Dutch-language surnames